Kaamana Billu is a 1983 Indian Kannada language film directed by Chi. Dattaraj. It stars Rajkumar, Anant Nag and Saritha. The film is based on the novel Mrigathrushna by Ashwini. This climax of the movie inspired a similar sequence in the 1999 Hindi movie Mann and its Telugu remake Ravoyi Chandamama.

Cast 
 Rajkumar as Suryanarayana "Soorappa"
 Anant Nag as Chandra
 Saritha as Girija
 Balakrishna
 K. S. Ashwath as Seshappa
 Thoogudeepa Srinivas
 M. S. Umesh
 Papamma
 Uma Shivakumar
 Shivaprakash
 Rajanand
 Mysore Lokesh
 Vishwanath
 Vivek Vishwakarma
 Malathi Holla
 Shanthamma

Soundtrack
The music of the film was composed by Upendra Kumar, with lyrics written by Chi. Udaya Shankar and Kuvempu.

Track list

References

External links 
 

1980s Kannada-language films
1983 films
Indian drama films
Films with screenplays by Chi. Udayashankar
Films based on Indian novels
Films scored by Upendra Kumar
Films directed by Chi. Dattaraj